008: Operation Exterminate is a 1965 Italian/Egyptian Eurospy action film directed and written by Umberto Lenzi and filmed in Egypt and Switzerland. It starred Ingrid Schoeller as Agent 008, and Alberto Lupo as Agent 006.

Plot
British agent 006 must recover a powerful super technology called "anti-radar"; his fellow American Agent 008 follows him because she suspects something sinister. After Agent 006 is able to recover the original plans of the machine in a journey from Switzerland to Egypt, Agent 008 discovers that 006 is actually a Russian spy ...

Cast
Ingrid Schoeller as MacDonald, agent 008 
Alberto Lupo as  Frank Smith, agent 006 
Dina De Santis as  Beauty institute manager 
Ivano Staccioli as Kemp, hotel manager (credited as John Heston) 
Sal Borgese as  Munk (credited as Mark Trevor) 
Omar El-Hariri  as  Police officer 
Ahmed Louxor  (credited as Amed Luxor) 
George Wang  as  Tanaka 
Edoardo Toniolo  as  Mister X 
Nando Angelini  as  Police lieutenant 
Domenico Ravenna  as  Heinz 
Omar Targoman
Fortunato Arena  as Stabbed man (credited as Lucky Arena)

External links 
 

1965 films
Italian action films
1960s Italian-language films
1960s action films
1960s spy thriller films
Italian spy thriller films
Films directed by Umberto Lenzi
Films shot in Egypt
Films shot in Switzerland
Films scored by Angelo Francesco Lavagnino
Parody films based on James Bond films
1960s Italian films